Mount Starr, elevation , is a mountain summit located on the crest of the Sierra Nevada mountain range in northern California, United States. It is situated in the John Muir Wilderness on the common boundary shared by Sierra National Forest with Inyo National Forest, and along the common border of Fresno County with Inyo County. It is bound on the east by Little Lakes Valley, and is 0.8 mile northeast of Mono Pass. Neighbors include Mount Abbot, three miles to the south-southwest, Mount Morgan, 2.5 miles to the southeast, and Pointless Peak is 2.5 miles to the north.

History
The first ascent of this mountain was made July 16, 1896, by Walter Starr Sr. and Allen Chickering. They were caught in a thunderstorm when everything started buzzing with electricity. Frightened, they descended off the mountain quickly, and would name the mountain "Electric Peak." However, the mountain would later be renamed after Walter Starr's son.

Named by the Sierra Club to honor one of their own, this mountain's toponym was officially adopted in 1939 by the United States Board on Geographic Names to remember Walter A. Starr Jr. (1903–1933), a mountain climber of renown, and author of "Guide to the John Muir Trail and the High Sierra Region." In the summer of 1933, "Pete", as he was nicknamed, failed to return from a month-long hike to the Minarets, and his body was eventually discovered by Norman Clyde following a search.

Climate
According to the Köppen climate classification system, Mount Starr is located in an alpine climate zone. Most weather fronts originate in the Pacific Ocean, and travel east toward the Sierra Nevada mountains. As fronts approach, they are forced upward by the peaks (orographic lift), causing them to drop their moisture in the form of rain or snowfall onto the range. Precipitation runoff from the west side of this mountain drains into Golden Creek, and from the east side into Rock Creek.

Gallery

See also

 List of the major 4000-meter summits of California

References

External links
 Weather forecast: Mount Starr
 Mount Starr rock climbing: Mountainproject.com
 Walter A. Starr, Jr. Biography and photo

Inyo National Forest
Sierra National Forest
Mountains of Inyo County, California
Mountains of Fresno County, California
Mountains of the John Muir Wilderness
North American 3000 m summits
Mountains of Northern California
Sierra Nevada (United States)